Yamatai is an ancient Japanese kingdom.

Yamatai may also refer to:

 Yamatai (Cornell University), a student-run taiko drum team
 Himiko Yamatai, a character in the Keio Flying Squadron series

See also 
 Yamata
 Yamatji
 Yamato (disambiguation)